Amaranath Jayathilake (20 May 1937 – 25 September 2013), was a journalist, writer and filmmaker in Sri Lankan cinema.

Personal life
Jayathilake was born on 20 May 1937 in Colombo, Sri Lanka.

On 4 September 2013, he was hospitalized following an accident and treated at Ward 74 of the Colombo National Hospital. He died on 25 September 2013 at the age of 77. His body was buried next day at 10.00 am in Kanatte Cemetery, following his last request that his body should be buried without any decorations or ceremony.

Career
Jayathilake started his film writing career with the Lankadeepa newspaper in 1961. In November of the same year, he went to Calcutta, India, to study film production.  During his time in India, he studied cinema with the Indian filmmaker Satyajit Ray, who was also a pioneer in introducing cinema to Sri Lanka. He visited leading studios in Madras and Bombay and studied film technology, mechanics, and technology.

In 1962, an organization called the "Sixteenth Cinema Kundaliya" was established to build a cinematic literature and film culture in Sri Lanka. In the same year, he also contributed to the success of the Film Commission of Sri Lanka. Under his guidance, a Satyajit Ray Film Festival was organized in Sri Lanka for the first time. Jayathilake was also the pioneer in introducing Banga cinema to Sri Lanka. After returning to Sri Lanka, he served as the founding vice president of the Film Critics and Writers Association in 1967.

In 1968, Jayathilake made his directorial debut with the film Adarawanthayo. In the film, singer and composer Victor Rathnayake began his career in background music. In 1977, he directed the film Siripala saha Ranmenika. The film became a huge blockbuster hit and broke all previous revenue records in Sinhala cinema. It is also the first Sinhala film to be purchased by India.In the same year, he released his next film Nivena Ginna. In 1981, he directed the film Eka Dawasak Re which received critics acclaim.

In 1984, he directed the film Aruna Pera which was invited to screen in all 14 major film festivals in India. In 1985, he won the Awards for Best Screenplay and Best Director for the film Arunata Pera at the 7th Presidential Film Festival. The same year, he won the Best Screenplay and Best Director Awards at the 12th OCIC Award Ceremony for the same film. In 1999, he was honored with the "Syril B Perera" Award at the 25th OCIC Award Ceremony. In addition to that, Arunata Pera is the first and only Sinhala film to be preserved in the Museum of Modern Art in New York, USA. The film won nine Presidential awards and nine SIGNIS OCIC awards.

He is the pioneer of Sri Lankan film literature. He wrote many books, such as 'Chithrapata Parichaya,' on various subjects to make film a classical art in Sri Lanka. He also edited an English film magazine called "Film Frame" and started a magazine called "Chithrapata Maadya" on behalf of the Film Sub-Panel under the Arts Council of Sri Lanka and was its assistant editor. It is the first academic film magazine published in the Sinhala language. Meanwhile, he became the Sri Lanka correspondent for the English language newspaper "Cine Advance," published in India. He later became a local correspondent for the Indian monthly magazines "Film Ward" and "Cinema India International."

Jayathilake wrote articles for over 20 years for the Japanese monthly magazine "Film & TV Marketing" and for 30 years for the annual film Guide, the "International Film Guide." He is a two-time member of the Advisory Board of the National Film Corporation of Sri Lanka. He also served as a member of the Jury at Film Festivals in India, Japan, and Germany. In 2003, he directed his final feature film Bheeshanaye Athuru Kathawak. The film was also screened at International Film Festival, Rotterdam.  In the mid-2000s, he studied cinema while staying in Hollywood, USA. In 2008, he was honored at the Film Writers' Awards Ceremony held under the patronage of veteran journalist Arthur U. Amarasena.

Filmography

References

External links
 

Sri Lankan film directors
1937 births
2013 deaths
Sinhalese writers
Sri Lankan screenwriters
20th-century screenwriters
People from British Ceylon